Sudeten German uprising in September 1938 was a spontaneous rebellion of Sudeten Germans against Czechoslovak authorities in Sudetenland, but at the same time, an organized action orchestrated by Sudeten German Party (SdP) chaired by Konrad Henlein. Therefore, the uprising is also referred to as the Henlein's coup (or coup attempt).

On 10 September 1938, all district organizations of the SdP received an order from Nuremberg to start protests and provocations. On 11 September, Henlein's supporters clashed with policemen and gendarmes in Cheb, Liberec, Teplice, and other places. On the evening of 12 September, Sudeten Germans listened en masse to the Hitler's radio speech accusing Czechoslovakia of torturing and oppressing the German minority. This speech sparked a wave of violence against Czechs, Jews and Sudeten German anti-fascists in the borderlands. On the morning of 13 September, the pre-planned armed uprising began with incidents such as the clash at Habersbirk and the first casualties being reported, amounting to 37 dead as of 15 September. By 14 September, the uprising was partially suppressed due to declaration of martial law, deployment of the military and reinforcement of the State Defence Guard. Nevertheless, unrest in the border regions continued.

Following the failed coup, the second phase of uprising began on 17 September with activities of Sudetendeutsches Freikorps, a paramilitary organization of Sudeten Germans formed in Germany. Its task was to continue fighting and conducting terrorist acts. According to the 1944 declaration of Czechoslovak government-in-exile, Czechoslovakia was in a state of war with the Third Reich from 17 September 1938. After numerous shootouts on 20 and 21 September, the rebellion broke again on 22 September when riots flared in other areas of Moravia and Silesia. In some cases, regular German units of Abwehr, SA and SS participated in combat, terrorist and sabotage actions.

Czechoslovak authorities responded by securing the border with Germany. Mobile army units reinforced by light tanks and armoured cars restored order in regions such as Cheb, Frýdlant, Šluknov, or Varnsdorf, resulting in a decline of insurgency activities. Realising what the Freikorps had done, many Sudeten Germans escaped across the border into Germany. Following the stepping up of Hitler's demands, mobilization of the Czechoslovak army was carried out on 23 September. Several counter-insurgency actions had to be revoked because the military units assumed defensive positions further inland.

With the signing of Munich Agreement the uprising was practically over, yet the violent incidents occurred occasionally even in October, the last one in Moravská Chrastová on 31 October. On 30 September, combat actions of the Freikorps were formally ended by an order No. 30. Nevertheless, Henlein's supporters continued in their attacks on retreating Czechoslovaks. On 1 October, Freikorps issued an order to “eliminate fleeing leftists and Czechs.” More than 200,000 people, mostly Czechs but also Jews and Sudeten German anti-fascists, fled from Sudetenland in fear of the Nazis.

See also 
 Fifth column
 Expulsion of Germans from Czechoslovakia

Notes

References

Sources 
 
 
 
 
 
 
 
 

1938 in Czechoslovakia
Conflicts in 1938
September 1938 events
October 1938 events
20th-century rebellions
Czechoslovakia–Germany relations
Fascist revolts
Wars involving Czechoslovakia